Dandy Nichols (born Daisy Sander; 21 May 1907 – 6 February 1986) was an English actress best known for her role as Else Garnett, the long-suffering wife of the character Alf Garnett who was a parody of a working class Tory, in the BBC sitcom Till Death Us Do Part.

Early life and career 
Born Daisy Sander in Fulham, London, she started her working life as a secretary in a London factory. Twelve years later, after drama, diction and fencing classes, she was spotted in a charity show by a producer, who offered her a job in his repertory theatre company in Cambridge. During her early career on stage she acted under the name Barbara Nichols but later changed it to Dandy, her childhood nickname.

When the Second World War broke out, she returned to office work but later undertook a six-week tour with ENSA. When the war was over, she returned to the theatre and also began appearing in films: usually comedies and almost invariably as a maid or charlady. The latter role she took on in the music video "Goody Two Shoes" by Adam Ant.

Her successes in theatre include the Royal Court Theatre and Broadway productions of Home. Her big screen debut was in Hue and Cry, in 1947, followed with performances in Nicholas Nickleby, The Fallen Idol, The Winslow Boy, The History of Mr Polly, Scott of the Antarctic, Mother Riley Meets the Vampire and Dickens' The Pickwick Papers.

Till Death Us Do Part 
Dandy Nichols's best-known role was Else Garnett in the landmark series Till Death Us Do Part. The part was originally played in the pilot episode for the series (as part of the BBC's Comedy Playhouse) by future EastEnders actress Gretchen Franklin. However, when it was commissioned as a series, Franklin was unable to break her contract for a West End play and Nichols was cast.

Dandy's role seemed, at first, almost negligible: spending the best part of one early episode reading the telephone book as Alf embarked on another of his tirades. However, Else proved to be a perfect foil for Alf, and could put him down effortlessly with a withering look or cutting remark. Perhaps her finest hour – in an episode shown by the BBC in tribute to Dandy in 1986 – was when, in 1974, Else took a leaf out of Prime Minister Edward Heath's book and went on a "three-day week", forcing Alf to fend for and feed himself on her days off.

In the original scripts, Alf was to refer to his wife as a "silly cow". This was firmly vetoed by BBC Head of Comedy Frank Muir, who thought this was inappropriate. Nichols said that it was "a lot of silly fuss about a silly moo" which was overheard by script writer Johnny Speight and became the series' most enduring catchphrase.

In Sickness and in Health
Till Death Us Do Part came to an end in 1975 but was revived in 1981, entitled Till Death..., and again in 1985. Dandy agreed to appear, but had been suffering from rheumatoid arthritis and had to use a wheelchair. Her illnesses were written into the scripts, and the series was appropriately renamed In Sickness and in Health.

The series continued after her death, with Alf left on his own.

Film career
She appeared in numerous films, which included Carry On Doctor, Ladies Who Do, The Holly and the Ivy, The Vikings, the Beatles' film Help!, Georgy Girl, Doctor in Clover, The Birthday Party, The Bed Sitting Room, O Lucky Man!, Confessions of a Window Cleaner and Britannia Hospital amongst others.

Later years
After her role in Till Death Do Us Part, Nichols found work in television, notably playing opposite Alastair Sim in William Trevor's production of The Generals Day. She made appearances in Flint, The Tea Ladies and Bergerac. On stage, she appeared in Ben Travers's comedy Plunder, as well as playing alongside Sir Ralph Richardson and Sir John Gielgud in David Storey's Home, in both London and on Broadway.

Personal life
Dandy Nichols was married to the newspaper editor Stephen Bagueley Waters in 1942, but the marriage ended in divorce in 1955 due to his adultery. Nichols was an atheist for most of her life.

Her poor health led to a fall in her flat and she died three days later of pneumonia and heart disease on 6 February 1986 aged 78 at the London Hospital, Whitechapel.

Television roles

Partial filmography

References

External links
 

1907 births
1986 deaths
English television actresses
English film actresses
English stage actresses
Deaths from pneumonia in England
People from Hammersmith
20th-century English actresses
English atheists
20th-century British businesspeople